The Bârnaru is a right tributary of the river Bistrița in Romania. It flows into the Bistrița between Crucea and Broșteni.

References

Rivers of Romania
Rivers of Suceava County